The Story of the Olive is a 1914 American silent popular short drama film written by and starring Caroline Frances Cooke. The film also stars Sydney Ayres, Perry Banks, Edith Borella, Jack Richardson, Vivian Rich, and Harry Van Meter.

Cast
 Jack Richardson as Ortega
 Caroline Frances Cooke as Ortega's lover
 Vivian Rich as Mercedes
 Harry Van Meter as Don Jose de Cabrillo
 Sydney Ayres		
 Perry Banks		
 Edith Borella

External links

1914 films
1914 drama films
Silent American drama films
American silent short films
American black-and-white films
1914 short films
Films directed by Sydney Ayres
1910s American films